Katherine Deves is an Australian lawyer who ran as a Liberal candidate for the federal seat of Warringah in the 2022 Australian federal election. She has come under fire for her views about transgender people.

Biography 
Deves co-founded the Save Women's Sport lobby group, intended to keep transgender women out of women's sport. 

Deves was nominated as a 'captain's pick' by Prime Minister Scott Morrison for the seat of Warringah, as the candidate for the Liberal Party, in the 2022 Australian federal election, despite a candidate, David Brady, had already been expected to receive Liberal nomination, and that she had already been declined to run for the seat on the grounds that she had not been a member of the party long enough. She was chosen by a three-person committee consisting of former president of the New South Wales Liberals Christine McDiven, Scott Morrison and New South Wales Premier Dominic Perrottet. 

During the campaign, comments relating to transgender people, were released, which caused significant controversy. Statements made by Deves included incorrectly claiming that gender reassignment surgery was available to teenagers and that anti-transgender activism was equivalent to 'standing up against the Holocaust'. Deves also stated that transgender children were 'surgically mutilated and sterilised", which she initially apologised for, before walking back the apology. She was invited to the Sydney Jewish Museum, after her comment relating to the Holocaust. Many Liberals, including Treasurer of New South Wales Matt Kean and member for the federal seat of North Sydney Trent Zimmermann called for her to be disendorsed, however other anonymous Liberal Party members and Scott Morrison backed Deves. 

Deves was defeated in the seat of Warringah, suffering a 6.6% swing. After the election, Deves objected to criticism that she was homophobic, stating on Sky News Australia, 'Of all of the untruths and distortions attributed to me in my public life there is one lie that hurts more than any other, and that is the completely groundless accusation that I am homophobic.'

Personal life 
Deves lives in Manly Vale with her partner and three daughters. She was injured after skiing at Thredbo, missing a party meeting. 

Deves is an active contributor to Sky News Australia and The Spectator.

References 

People from New South Wales
21st-century Australian lawyers
Living people
Liberal Party of Australia politicians
1970s births
21st-century women lawyers
Australian women lawyers
21st-century Australian women politicians
New South Wales politicians